The Cape Royal Trail is a hiking trail on the North Rim of the Grand Canyon National Park, located in the U.S. state of Arizona.

Access
The paved trail begins in the parking area at the southern end of Cape Royal Road on the north rim.

Description
From the parking area, the trail heads south with signs describing the views and the local flora.  Viewpoints along the trail include Angel's window (a natural arch), and Cape Royal itself at the end of the trail.  The trail is ½ mile (0.8 km) in length, making a 1-mile (1.6 km) round trip.

See also
 The Grand Canyon
 List of trails in Grand Canyon National Park

References
 Grand Canyon Explorer, Cape Royal Trail description
 Hike Arizona
 OpenStreetMap
 OpenStreetMap GPX file download

External links
 Official Grand Canyon National Park website

Hiking trails in Grand Canyon National Park
Grand Canyon, North Rim
Grand Canyon, Walhalla Plateau